Valenopsalis is an extinct mammal from the Paleocene of North America (more specifically, Puercan-aged deposits in Wyoming, Montana and Saskatchewan. Originally referred to the genus Catopsalis (C. joyneri), it has more recently been moved to its own genus as the former was understood to be a wastebasket taxon. It is currently considered to be the most basal representative of Taeniolabidoidea.

References

Cimolodonts
Paleocene mammals of North America
Fossil taxa described in 2015
Prehistoric mammal genera